The Croatia national under-21 football team represents Croatia in association football matches for players aged 21 or under.

The team played its first match, a friendly against Hungary in Zagreb in 1992. Since that time, Croatia qualified for five UEFA European Under-21 Championship, namely 2000, 2004, 2019, 2021 and 2023. Croatia was unable to pass the group stage until the 2021 Euro when it was eliminated in the quarter-finals, its greatest accomplishment in the European competition so far.

UEFA European Under-21 Championship

2023 UEFA European Under-21 Championship qualification

2023 UEFA European Under-21 Championship play-offs 

The four play-off winners qualify for the final tournament.

All times are CEST (UTC+2), as listed by UEFA (local times, if different, are in parentheses).

|}

Results and fixtures

2022

2023

2024

Coaching staff

Current coaching staff

Players

Current squad 

The following was the final squad for the friendlies played against Israel and England on 23 and 28 March 2023.

Recent call-ups 

The following players have also been called up to the squad in the last 12 months and are still eligible for selection.

Key
SEN = Joined the senior team.
INJ = Injured or ill.
WD = Withdrew from the squad.
SUS = Suspended from participating.

Competative record

UEFA European Under-21 Championship 

Notes
OFF = Lost in play-offs.

Statistics

Managers 

The following table provides a summary of the complete record of each manager including their results regarding European Under-21 Championship.

Key: Pld–games played, W–games won, D–games drawn; L–games lost, %–win percentage

Last updated: Croatia vs Finland, 29 March 2022. Statistics include official FIFA-recognised matches only.

Most capped players

Top goalscorers

Record per opponent

See also 

 Croatia men's national under-21 football team results
 Croatia men's national football team
 Croatia men's national football B team
 Croatia men's national under-23 football team
 Croatia men's national under-20 football team
 Croatia men's national under-19 football team
 Croatia men's national under-18 football team
 Croatia men'snational under-17 football team
 Croatia men's national under-16 football team
 Croatia men's national under-15 football team
 Croatia women's national football team
 Croatia women's national under-19 football team
 Croatia women's national under-17 football team

References

External links 

 Under-21 at UEFA.com
 U23/U21 Tournaments at the Rec.Sport.Soccer Statistics Foundation website
 Croatia youth teams players' statistics at the Croatian Football Federation website

Croatia national under-21 football team
European national under-21 association football teams
Youth football in Croatia